D59 is a state road connecting the city of Knin with D8 state road near Pirovac.

The road also serves as a connecting road to the A1 motorway as it is connected to Pirovac interchange via a short connector road. The northern terminus of the road is located immediately to the west of Knin, and the road is normally considered to run to the city itself. Likewise, the southern terminus is immediately to the south of Pirovac. The intersection with D8 state road, where D59 terminates, also represents the northern terminus of D121 state road to Murter.

The road, as well as all other state roads in Croatia, is managed and maintained by Hrvatske ceste, a state-owned company.

Traffic volume 

Traffic is regularly counted and reported by Hrvatske ceste, operator of the road. Substantial variations between annual (AADT) and summer (ASDT) traffic volumes are attributed to the fact that the road serves as a connection to A1 motorway and it carries substantial tourist traffic.

Road junctions and populated areas

See also
 Hrvatske autoceste

Sources

D059
D059
D059